"Veni Sancte Spiritus", sometimes called the Golden Sequence, is a sequence prescribed in the Roman Liturgy for the Masses of Pentecost and its octave, exclusive of the following Sunday. It is usually attributed to either the thirteenth-century Pope Innocent III or to the Archbishop of Canterbury, Cardinal Stephen Langton, although it has been attributed to others as well.

"Veni Sancte Spiritus" is one of only four medieval Sequences which were preserved in the Roman Missal published in 1570 following the Council of Trent (1545–63). Before Trent, many feasts had their own sequences. It is still sung today in some parishes on Pentecost Sunday.

Text

Musical settings

The sequence was set to music by a number of composers, especially during the Renaissance, including Dufay, Josquin, Willaert, Palestrina, John Dunstaple, Lassus, Victoria, and Byrd. Marc-Antoine Charpentier wrote one setting, H.364, H.364 a, for 3 voices and bc (1690s). Later composers who have set the text include Arvo Pärt, Morten Lauridsen, Frank La Rocca, George Fenton, and Samuel Webbe.

References

External links
 H.T. Henry. Veni Sancte Spiritus, in the Catholic Encyclopedia (1917)
 John Caldwell: 'Veni Sancte Spiritus', Grove Music Online ed. L. Macy (Accessed 28 June 2006), <http://www.grovemusic.com>
 Scores for Veni Sancte Spiritus at the Choral Public Domain Library

Latin-language Christian hymns
Hymns for Pentecost
Roman Catholic prayers
Catholic liturgy